Tour d'Egypte is a professional road cycling stage race held annually each February in Egypt. Tour d'Egypte is part of the UCI Africa Tour.

Winners

References

Cycle races in Egypt
UCI Africa Tour races
Recurring sporting events established in 1954
1954 establishments in Egypt
Winter events in Egypt